The Adolph F. Rupp Trophy was an award given annually to the top player in men's Division I NCAA basketball until 2015. The recipient of the award was selected by an independent panel consisting of national sportswriters, coaches, and sports administrators.  The trophy was presented each year at the site of the Final Four of the NCAA Men's Division I Basketball Championship.

The Adolph F. Rupp Trophy was administered by the Commonwealth Athletic Club of Kentucky, a non-profit organization with a primary mission of honoring the legacy of University of Kentucky coach Adolph Rupp. Three winners of the award have been freshmen: Kevin Durant of Texas in 2007, John Wall of Kentucky in 2010 and Anthony Davis of Kentucky in 2012.

Winners

See also
List of U.S. men's college basketball national player of the year awards

References

External links
Official site

Awards established in 1972
Awards disestablished in 2015
College basketball player of the year awards in the United States
College basketball trophies and awards in the United States